William Lawrence Mitchell (March 1, 1928 – January 5, 2010) was an American trumpeter, bandleader, soul, R&B, rock and roll, pop and funk record producer and arranger who ran Royal Studios in Memphis, Tennessee. He was best known for his Hi Records label of the 1970s, which released albums by a large stable of popular Memphis soul artists, including Mitchell himself, Al Green, O. V. Wright, Syl Johnson, Ann Peebles and Quiet Elegance.

Biography
Born and raised in Ashland, Mississippi, Mitchell moved to Memphis when he was in high school. He attended Rust College. At the age of eight, he began to play the trumpet. While in high school, he was a featured player in popular local big bands. He later formed his own combo, which from time to time included musicians such as trumpeter Booker Little, saxophonists Charles Lloyd, and George Coleman, and pianist Phineas Newborn, Jr.

Mitchell landed a job with the Home of the Blues record label as a producer, then left to join Hi Records as both a recording artist and a producer.

Known at the recording studio as "Papa Willie", Mitchell earned his nickname by taking over the reins of Hi Records in 1970 and guiding it through its most successful period.  Mitchell's productions have been much noted for featuring a hard-hitting bass drum sound (usually played by pioneering Memphis drummer Al Jackson, Jr. of Booker T. & the M.G.'s).

A trumpeter and bandleader in his own right, Mitchell released a number of popular singles for Hi Records as an artist in the 1960s, including "Soul Serenade." It peaked at number 43 in the UK Singles Chart in April 1968.

Through the 1980s, Mitchell ran his own independent record label, Waylo Records. Acts on the label included Billy Always and Lynn White.

In 1987, Joyce Cobb recorded several singles for Waylo, one of which made it to No. 3 on the British R&B chart: "Another Lonely Night (Without You)", while in 1987, Mitchell worked on a version of Wet Wet Wet's debut album, which was issued in 1988 as The Memphis Sessions.

He and Al Green revived their successful recording partnership in 2003 when Green recorded I Can't Stop, his first collaboration with Mitchell since 1985's He is the Light. Their 2005 follow-up project was Everything's OK.

Mitchell died in Memphis on January 5, 2010, from a cardiac arrest.

His final work was producing the final Solomon Burke studio album, Nothing's Impossible, released in June 2010.

Discography
 1963: Sunrise Serenade
 1964: 20-75
 1964: Hold It
 1965: It's Dance Time
 1966: It's What's Happenin'''
 1966: The Hit Sound Of Willie Mitchell 1967: Ooh Baby, You Turn Me On 1968: Willie Mitchell Live at the Royal 1968: Soul Serenade 1969: On Top 
 1969: Solid Soul 1969: Soul Bag 1970: Robbin's Nest 1970: The Many Moods of Willie Mitchell 1971: Listen Dance 1977: Willie Mitchell Live 1981: Willie Willie Willie 1986: That Driving Beat 2001: Poppa Willie The Hi Years / 1962-74 2003: Walkin' With Willie 2008: Best Damn Fool'' (with Buddy Guy)

Singles

 A"Soul Serenade" peaked at number 32 on Billboard Adult Contemporary chart

References

External links

 
 Musician Willie Mitchell dead at 82
  Famed musician, record producer Willie Mitchell dies

1928 births
2010 deaths
African-American songwriters
American bandleaders
American music industry executives
Record producers from Mississippi
Record producers from Tennessee
American soul musicians
American trumpeters
American male trumpeters
Hi Records artists
Musicians from Mississippi
Soul-blues musicians
Musicians from Memphis, Tennessee
People from Ashland, Mississippi
Songwriters from Tennessee
Songwriters from Mississippi
Bearsville Records artists
20th-century African-American people
21st-century African-American people
American male songwriters